Ezenwo Nyesom Wike  (born 13 December 1967) is a Nigerian politician and lawyer who is the sixth and current Governor of Rivers State since May 2015. He is an Ikwerre from Rumuepirikom in Obio-Akpor, Rivers State. He is a member of the People's Democratic Party and was educated at Rivers State University of Science and Technology.

Wike was elected as a two-term Executive Chairman of Obio Akpor Local Government Area from 1999 to 2007. He was appointed Minister of State for Education on 14 July 2011. Wike was later appointed the Acting Minister of Education, after Mrs Ruqqayatu was sacked but resigned before finishing his term to campaign for Governor of Rivers State. He was replaced by Viola Onwuliri. In 2014, he won the Rivers State People's Democratic Party primary and chose former Secretary to the State Government Ipalibo Banigo as his running mate for deputy governor.

Wike defeated Dakuku Peterside of the All Progressives Congress (APC) and Tonye Princewill of the Labour Party in the 11 April gubernatorial elections to emerge as governor.
In March 2022, Wike declared that he will be running for the office of the president of Nigeria under the platform of the People's Democratic Party ahead of the 2023 General election, he was defeated by Atiku Abubakar who won the primaries with 371 votes while Wike got 237 votes being the first runner up. during the People's Democratic Party presidential election primary which was held at the MKO ABIOLA National stadium, Abuja  on 28 and 29 May 2022.

Education
Wike attended Government Secondary School Eneka in Obiakpor, Rivers State where he sat for his O'level exams before proceeding to the Rivers State University of Science and Technology (RSUT). He obtained a Bachelor of Laws degree from RSUT before proceeding to Law School in 1997. Wike holds a Master of Arts degree in Political and Administrative Studies from RSUT.

Political career
Wike began his political career as the Executive Chairman of Obio Akpor Local Government Area in Rivers in 1999, a position he held until 2007, after being re-elected in 2003. In 2007, he was appointed as the chief of staff to the governor of Rivers State, Rotimi Amaechi.
In July 2011, he was appointed as the Minister of State for Education by President Goodluck Jonathan and was promoted to Federal Minister of Education in September 2013. He stepped down as Federal Minister to contest in the 2015 gubernatorial elections in his home state, Rivers State.

Rivers State Election Petition Tribunal
On 13 May 2015, the Election Tribunal for Rivers State, sitting in Abuja, commenced the hearing on the election of Wike. 
Dr Dakuku Peterside of the APC was asking the tribunal to nullify the election of Nyesom Wike of the PDP who was declared winner as governor in the poll held on 11 April 2015, on the grounds that it was fraught with malpractices and non-compliance with the provisions of the Electoral Act.

Wike opposed the hearing of the case in Abuja, arguing that the Tribunal should be held in Port Harcourt. But the then President of the Court of Appeal, Justice Zainab Bulkachawa, rejected Wike's arguments and ordered that the tribunal be held in Abuja, for reason of security. Justice Zainab also ordered that, besides Rivers, all Election Petition Tribunals for Adamawa, Borno and Yobe be held in the Nigerian capital, Abuja.

After failing to serve Wike with court summons, presiding Justice Muazu Pindiga approved the request by Mr Oluwarotimi Odunayo Akeredolu, the counsel to Dr Dakuku Peterside of the All Progressives Congress, to grant an order for substituted service on the governor-elect because Wike had been evading service of court summon and other processes in the petition challenging Wike's elections. Akeredolu stated that the court bailiffs had on several occasions visited Wike's residence to effect court service on him but was on all the occasions turned back at the gate by Wike's security guards upon discovery that he was a court bailiff.

Ruling on the petitioner's counsel's motion, Justice Pindiga, who granted the prayers, ordered that the court processes should be pasted on the wall of Wike's house. He said that "I have gone through the motion ex-parte and it is hereby granted; all the court processes are deemed valid." Justice Pindiga then ordered that substituted service be effected against Wike either by pasting the court process on Wike's house or at the office of the PDP secretariat in Rivers state or in Abuja.

The Rivers State governorship election tribunal nullified the election of Wike on 24 October 2015. The election tribunal ordered governorship election rerun in Rivers State within 90 days immediately after the day of judgment. Wike said he would appeal the ruling of the tribunal.

Discrepancy in the accredited votes in the Rivers Elections for Wike
The Election Tribunal was informed that the Independent National Electoral Commission in Rivers awarded Wike votes almost five times higher than the actual, authentic total number of voters accredited with card readers and Permanent Voter Cards which was 292, 878, which was the total number of accredited voters for 11 April 2015, gubernatorial election in Rivers. The result was declared by the Returning Officer for Rivers State, Osasere Orumwense on 13 April 2015, stating that Wike was awarded 1,029,102 votes, thus winning the election.

However document was signed by Ibrahim Bawa, the acting director in charge of INEC Legal Unit and Abimbola Oladunjoye, head of unit, Data Management, of the commission's Information and Communication Technology Department. According to the result declared by the Returning Officer for Rivers State, Osasere Orumwense on 13 April, Wike was awarded 1,029,102 votes, representing 87.77 per cent of 1,228,614, being the conjured number of total accredited voters. But the tribunal was informed that according to INEC documents, tendered as court evidence, the total number of accredited voters in Rivers was only 292, 878. It was also common knowledge, however, that there was widespread malfunction of Card Readers on the Election Day prompting the extension of the election to the next day and granting recourse to the use of manual accreditation without the faulty card readers.

The INEC document was signed by Mr. Ibrahim Bawa, the acting director in charge of INEC Legal Unit and Abimbola Oladunjoye, head of unit, Data Management, of the INEC's Information and Communication Technology Department. The commission's central server captured all actual validated and authenticated votes for the Rivers State elections on 11 April 2015, making fraud by manual accreditation impossible.

In that election, only those votes captured by the central servers from the PVC-SCR are deemed accredited and valid; manual accreditation is not allowed for governorship elections. The Court of Appeal has however ruled in the case of Agbaje vs Ambode that the non use of card readers is not a ground to nullify an election. The River State governorship election tribunal nullified the election of Wike on 24 October 2015. The election tribunal ordered governorship election rerun in Rivers State within 90 days immediately after the day of judgment generating uproar within the country as to alleged partisanship and corruption within the judiciary.

2019 Gubernatorial Re-election
INEC declared Nyesom Wike winner of Rivers State governorship polls on Wednesday, 3 April 2019, after suspending the process for some days. Wike took his oath of office on Wednesday, 29 May 2019 at Yakubu Gowon Stadium, Port Harcourt as he commences his second term. In his address, he promised to put Rivers state first.

In May 2022, he contested for the People's Democratic Party presidential ticket but lost to Atiku Abubakar, He also supported Sim Fubara as the PDP governorship candidate in Rivers state

Reforms
In line with his plans for educational reform, Nyesom Wike declared public primary and secondary education free. He disclosed this on Monday, 24 June 2019, in a meeting at the government house, Port Harcourt. This was joined with complaints and appreciation; The latter from parents and former Principals and headmasters in the state. However, the Government of Wike held its ground amidst the perpetual demur until they all dissolved.

In 2019, Wike through the State Ministry of Education announced free registration for participating locals of the state in the annual JAMB examination.

In 2022, he signed a measure into law that strengthens a women's right to inherit property. Upon signing the bill, he encouraged women to claim what is theirs and said they should not be afraid to do so because it is their legal right.

Projects
During his second term as a governor, he kicked-off the construction of three major flyovers simultaneously in Port Harcourt. The location of the flyovers are at Garrison, Rumoukoro and Artillery.

See also
List of Governors of Rivers State

References

 
1967 births
Living people
Governors of Rivers State
Rivers State Peoples Democratic Party politicians
Rivers State University alumni
Ezenwo
People from Obio-Akpor
Lawyers from Port Harcourt
Ikwerre people
Commanders of the Order of the Federal Republic
Nigerian Christians
20th-century Nigerian lawyers
Nigerian Law School alumni
Nigerian government officials